St. Mary's College, Hyderabad is an undergraduate co-educational college in India offering BA/BBA/BCom/BSc programmes of the Osmania University and several certificate courses of its own. It is located in Yousufguda, which is in Khairatabad Mandal of Hyderabad District, Telangana State.

History 

St. Mary's College has its origins in the establishment of St. Mary's Junior College at Himayatnagar in Hyderabad, India in 1982. 
Subsequently, the junior college was shifted to its present premises at Basheer Bagh and soon became an institution of choice for many in Hyderabad. In 1995, a second campus of the Junior College opened at Yousufguda in Hyderabad, which became an undergraduate college in 2002. St. Mary's College at Yousufguda is now one of the most sought after co-educational undergraduate colleges in the region.

St. Mary's College, Hyderabad is one of the several institutions run by the St. Mary's Educational Society, Hyderabad. The founder of the group is Mr B. Arogya Reddy, who was the first Principal of St. Mary's Junior College at Himayatnagar, Hyderabad. He is currently the Chairman of the Society. Mr B. Mahender Reddy heads the Group of St Mary's Institutions currently as its Chief Executive Officer. He was the first Principal of St. Mary's College, Hyderabad. Prof J Mathew George is the current principal of the college.

About the college

St. Mary's College, Hyderabad is affiliated to the Osmania University and is accredited by the National Assessment and Accreditation Council. The college has collaborative agreements with the Budapest Metropolitan University, California Baptist University, Beijing Information Science & Technology University, St. Mary's University, Texas, Red River College, the Chartered Institute for Securities & Investment and with companies such as Amazon (company) and Cognizant.

The city campus located at Tahir Ville in Yousufguda has a basketball court and a volleyball court as play area. The campus also houses various laboratories in Life Sciences, Chemistry, Electronics, Computer Science and Mass Communication.

Academics 
St Mary's College offers eight undergraduate programmes of six-semester duration such as  Bachelor of Business Administration, Bachelor of Arts (Mass communication), Bachelor of Commerce (General/Computer Applications/Vocational and Business Analytics), and Bachelor of Science (Maths, Electronics & Computer Science / Maths, Stats & Computer Science / Biotechnology, Biochemistry & Chemistry) under the Choice-Based Credit System. In addition, the college also offers several certificate courses in diverse areas, including in conversational French and Spanish.

The college is organised into five major academic departments: English & Languages, Business Management, Commerce & Accounting, Sciences, and Social Sciences & Humanities. Each of these departments are led by a Head of the Department. The college also has a Head for Research & Consultancy and a Head for Student Activities & Alumni Relations. Mr T Joseph Christadoss, Head, Department of Social Sciences & Communication, was awarded the Telangana State Award for Teachers in September 2017.

The college's Student Information System and online administration are powered by Fedena. The college has its own learning portal built on Moodle for e-learning. These platforms allow for effective blended learning strategies involving offline and online courses.

Library is maintaining a blog namely https://oursmclibrary.wordpress.com/ covers all previous question papers, library activities etc.

Students and alumni

A number of famous Hyderabadis such as Ram Charan, N. T. Rama Rao Jr., Sania Mirza, Ashwini Ponnappa, Swathi Reddy, Naga Chaitanya, Sai Dharam Tej, 
Varun Tej,Vaisshnav Tej, Rajive Dhavan, Rana Daggubati, Naina Jaiswal, Aruna Budda Reddy and Heroshini Komali have studied in this institution. Many celebrities and political leaders have their children studying in St Mary's College. Over two hundred international students registered through the Osmania University Foreign Relations Office also study here.

St Mary's College is known for its thrust on student activities and student leadership. The Student Council of the College provides leadership to the student initiatives on campus. Mr B Murali Krishna is the current President of the Student Council. Student clubs, some focusing on co-curricular activities and some on extra-curricular activities, thrive on campus, and organise competitive and non-competitive events round the year. There are fifteen student clubs on campus. In addition, the National Service Scheme also has its unit on campus.

References

Universities and colleges in Hyderabad, India
Educational institutions established in 1982
1982 establishments in Andhra Pradesh